WDLD (96.7 FM, "Live 96-7") is a radio station licensed to Halfway, Maryland. Owned by Alpha Media, it broadcasts a rhythmic top 40 format serving Hagerstown, Maryland.

History 

On November 1, 2018, WDLD rebranded from Wild 96-7 to Live 96-7, seguing from rhythmic contemporary to a mainstream CHR format while retaining as a rhythmic top 40 station.

References

External links

DLD
Contemporary hit radio stations in the United States
Radio stations established in 2002
2002 establishments in Maryland
Alpha Media radio stations